
Gmina Studzienice is a rural gmina (administrative district) in Bytów County, Pomeranian Voivodeship, in northern Poland.

Villages
Gmina Studzienice contains the villages and settlements of Bielawy, Błotowo, Bukówki, Cechyny, Chabzewo, Czarna Dąbrowa, Dzierżążnik, Fiszewo, Imieni, Jabłończ Wielka, Kamionka, Kłączno, Kostki, Koźlice, Łąkie, Lipuszki, Łubieniec, Małe, Ociaskowo, Okuny, Osława Dąbrowa, Osowo Małe, Półczenko, Półczno, Prądzonka, Przewóz, Rabacino, Róg, Róg Osada, Rynszt, Skwierawy, Sominki, Sominy, Studzienice, Ugoszcz and Widno.

Neighbouring gminas
Gmina Studzienice is bordered by the gminas of Brusy, Bytów, Dziemiany, Lipnica, Lipusz and Parchowo.

References
 Polish official population figures 2006

Studzienice
Bytów County